Mummy & Me is a 2010 Malayalam Physiological thriller written and directed by Jeethu Joseph. Mummy & Me stars Archana Kavi, Mukesh, Urvashi and Kunchacko Boban in the main lead and the remaining cast include Lalu Alex,  Shari, Janardhanan, and Anoop Menon.

Synopsis
The story is about a nuclear family consisting of a mother named Clara, a daughter, Jewel, a brother named Joekuttan, and a father named Joseph.  They love each other and are engaged in each other's activities.

Jewel is a new-age girl with open, positive relationships, but Clara is a conventional mother who is always on the lookout to find fault with her daughter and trying to correct her in every way she can. Jewel is going through a lot of age things and finds difficulty to tell this to her parents that she wants to be alone, do what she wants, but her mother does not agree and thinks Jewel might get onto the wrong path.

Meanwhile, her dad buys her a brand new computer for her to enjoy herself and Jewel befriends a fashion designer through chatting, who calls himself Amir. They make a mutual agreement not to ask for each other's true identity. Jewel starts sharing her problems with Ameer, and he gives her suggestions and advice.  Slowly Jewel starts behaving well with everyone and everyone is happy as well as surprised at her change.

After a while, Jewel starts believing that she is in love with Amir and tells this to her friend Rahul who has a crush on her. Heartbroken, Rahul shares the news with his parents as well as Jewel's. Her parents first try to stop this relationship but, fearing that she might take any wrong step, they tell her that they want to meet Ameer. Ameer fixes a date to meet her family, but on that day he does not turn up. A priest named Fr. Felix comes to their home that day with a CD of Ameer's voice in which he tells her that he is bedridden and is counting his last days. Fr. Felix informs them that Ameer is no more.

Jewel is shattered by this news but recovers soon and marries Rahul. In the last scene of the movie, everyone goes to Felix's orphanage and there we see Amir who watches them from a distance and tells Felix that it was a good decision to tell them that he is dead.

Cast
 Archana Jose Kavi as Jewel Joseph
 Kunchacko Boban as Rahul
 Mukesh as Joseph
 Urvashi as Clara Joseph
 Suresh Gopi as Amir (guest appearance)
 Lalu Alex as Thomas, Rahul's Father
 Shari as Mary, Rahul's Mother
 Master Jeevan as Joekuttan Joseph
 Anoop Menon as Dr. Salim P. Ummer
 Janardhanan as Fr.Felix
 Sudheesh as Reji
 Arun as Freddy
 Aravind Akash as Deepan
Sudhi Koppa as College Student
 Bineesh Kodiyeri as GV
 Ganja Karuppu as Lalu

Location
Filming was held in Elamgulam, Kottayam district and in Ponkunnam. In the film, the college where Jewel was studying is Amal Jyothi College of Engineering.

Release
The film was released on 21 May 2010.

Box office
The film was commercial success.

Award
 Filmfare Award for Best Supporting Actress - Malayalam - Urvashi

Soundtrack 
The film's soundtrack contains 6 songs, all composed by Sejo John. Lyrics by Vayalar Sarathchandra Varma, Shelton Pinheiro.

References

External links
 
 oneindia.in
 nowrunning.com
 indiaglitz.com

2010 films
2010s Malayalam-language films
Films directed by Jeethu Joseph